Major League Baseball (MLB) and its participating clubs have retired various uniform numbers over the course of time, ensuring that those numbers are never worn again and thus will always be associated with particular players or managers of note. The use of numbers on uniforms to better identify one player from another, and hence to boost sales of scorecards, was tried briefly by the Cleveland Indians of 1916, but this failed.  The first team to permanently adopt the practice was the New York Yankees of 1929. By 1932, all 16 major league clubs were issuing numbers, and by 1937, the leagues passed rules requiring it.

The Yankees' original approach was to simply assign the numbers 1 through 8 to the regular starting lineup in their normal batting order. Hence, Babe Ruth wore number 3 and Lou Gehrig number 4. The first major leaguer whose number was retired was Gehrig, in July 1939, following his retirement due to amyotrophic lateral sclerosis, which became popularly known in the United States as Lou Gehrig's Disease.

Since then, over 150 other people have had their numbers retired, some with more than one team. This includes managers and coaches, as MLB is the only one of the major North American professional leagues in which the coaching staff wear the same uniforms as players. Three numbers have been retired in honor of people not directly involved on the playing field – all three for team executives. Some of the game's early stars, such as Ty Cobb and Christy Mathewson, retired before numbers came into usage. Teams often celebrate their retired numbers and other honored people by hanging banners with the numbers and names. Early stars, as well as honored non-players, will often have numberless banners hanging along with the retired numbers. Because fewer and fewer players stay with one team long enough to warrant their number being retired, some players believe that getting their number retired is a greater honor than going into the Baseball Hall of Fame. Ron Santo, upon his number 10 being retired by the Chicago Cubs on the last day of the 2003 regular season, enthusiastically told the Wrigley Field crowd as his #10 flag was hoisted, "This is my Hall of Fame!" However, Santo would be inducted into the Hall of Fame in July 2012, nearly two years after his death, after being voted in by the Veterans Committee.

List of all-time retired numbers

List of pending number retirements

Former retired numbers
It is very rare for a team to reissue a retired number, and usually requires a special circumstance, such as the person for whom the number was retired returning to the team in a player, coach or manager role.  Harold Baines provides one example of this when he returned to the White Sox multiple times.  The White Sox also re-issued Luis Aparicio's number 11, with his permission, to fellow countryman Omar Vizquel in 2010–11.

In cases of franchise relocation, the handling of existing retired numbers is at the discretion of team management.  The team may decide to continue honoring the retired numbers (as did the San Francisco Giants), or it may choose to make a "fresh start" and reissue the numbers (as the Washington Nationals have done).

The Cincinnati Reds returned Willard Hershberger's number 5 to circulation two years after his death.  Cincinnati later re-retired the number to honor Johnny Bench.

When the Florida Marlins moved to their current stadium, LoanDepot Park, and were rebranded as the Miami Marlins, the number 5, which had been retired for the team's late first president Carl Barger, was returned to circulation because player Logan Morrison requested permission to wear the number to honor his father.

Retired in honor of multiple players
The following numbers have been retired in honor of multiple players:
 Chicago Cubs, #31: retired in 2009 for Ferguson Jenkins and Greg Maddux
 Cincinnati Reds, #5: retired in 1940 for Willard Hershberger who had committed suicide during the season; returned to service in 1942; retired in 1984 for Johnny Bench
 Montreal Expos, #10: retired for Rusty Staub in 1993; ceremony to honor #10 for Andre Dawson was held in 1997
 New York Yankees, #8: retired in 1972 for Bill Dickey and Yogi Berra
 St. Louis Cardinals, #42: retired in 1997 by all teams in MLB for Jackie Robinson; ceremony to honor #42 for Bruce Sutter was held in 2006
 New York Yankees, #42: retired in 1997 by all teams in MLB for Jackie Robinson (players already wearing the number could continue to do so by special arrangement); ceremony to honor #42 for Mariano Rivera was held in 2013
 Oakland Athletics, #34: retired for Rollie Fingers in 1993; ceremony to honor #34 for Dave Stewart will be held in 2022.

Retired by multiple teams
A handful of players who had notable careers for multiple teams have had their numbers retired by each team.
 Frank Robinson's #20 was retired by the Reds, Orioles and the then-Indians.
 Rod Carew's #29 was retired by the Twins and Angels.
 Hank Aaron's #44 was retired by the Braves and Brewers.
 Reggie Jackson had his #9 retired by the Athletics, and his #44 retired by the Yankees.
 Rollie Fingers' #34 was retired by the Athletics and Brewers.
 Carlton Fisk had his #27 retired by the Red Sox, and his #72 retired by the White Sox.
 Greg Maddux's #31 was retired by the Cubs and Braves.
 Nolan Ryan had his #30 retired by the Angels, while his #34 is retired by the Astros and Rangers.
 Wade Boggs's #12 was retired by the then-Devil Rays, and his #26 is retired by the Red Sox.
 Roy Halladay's #32 was retired by the Blue Jays, and his #34 is retired by the Phillies.
 Jackie Robinson’s #42 has been retired by every team in the MLB, due to him breaking the color barrier in baseball.
 Gil Hodges' #14 was retired by the Mets and Dodgers.
 Willie Mays' #24 was retired by the Giants and Mets.

Excluding Jackie Robinson, only Frank Robinson and Nolan Ryan have had their number(s) retired by three teams. Managers Casey Stengel and Sparky Anderson have also had numbers retired by two teams. Stengel's #37 was retired by the Yankees and Mets. Anderson's #10 was retired by the Reds, and his #11 was retired by the Tigers.

Alternative methods of recognition 

A number of teams have formal or informal policies of only retiring numbers of players inducted into the Baseball Hall of Fame, although there is no league-wide uniformity and teams sometimes break their own guidelines.  As an alternative to retiring numbers, many teams have established other means of honoring former players, such as team-specific Halls of Fame (Angels, Astros, Athletics, Braves, Brewers, Cardinals, Indians, Mariners, Mets, Orioles, Padres, Rangers, Reds, Red Sox, and Twins) or Walls of Fame (Giants and Phillies), a Ring of Honor (Nationals) or Level of Excellence (Blue Jays).  In addition, several teams have kept certain numbers out of circulation since a player left, but have not formally retired them. The Rangers introduced a third means of honoring former players while preparing to open their current home of Globe Life Field in 2020. In December 2019, a few months before the park's opening, the team announced that all of its retired numbers would be incorporated into the park's posted dimensions.

The Montreal Expos franchise retired jerseys in honor of four players, but returned the numbers to use upon moving to Washington, D.C., to begin play as the Washington Nationals in 2005, becoming the only MLB team with no retired numbers other than Jackie Robinson's No. 42. In 2010, the Nationals established a "Ring of Honor" which as of 2022 includes three of those Expos players (Gary Carter, Andre Dawson, and Tim Raines), along with the Expos' last and Nationals' first manager,  Frank Robinson; Nationals players Iván "Pudge" Rodríguez, Jayson Werth, and Ryan Zimmerman; original Washington Senators (1901–1960) players Joe Cronin, Rick Ferrell, Goose Goslin, Bucky Harris, Walter Johnson, Heinie Manush, Sam Rice, Harmon Killebrew, and Early Wynn, as well as owner Clark Griffith; expansion Washington Senators (1961–1971) player Frank Howard; and Homestead Grays players Cool Papa Bell, Ray Brown, Josh Gibson, Buck Leonard, Cumberland Posey, and Jud Wilson. The Nationals finally retired their first number, Ryan Zimmerman's No. 11, on June 18, 2022.

The Miami Marlins had previously retired #5 in honor of their first team president, the late Carl Barger, but returned it to use entering the 2012 season when they relocated to the venue now known as LoanDepot Park. As of 2023, they are the only franchise with no retired numbers (aside from Jackie Robinson's).

Numbers kept out of circulation 
Some teams have not formally retired certain numbers, but nonetheless kept them out of circulation. For example, the Los Angeles Dodgers' current policy is only to retire the numbers of longtime club members if they are inducted into the Hall of Fame; the lone exception was longtime Dodger player and coach Jim Gilliam, whose #19 was retired when he died of a cerebral hemorrhage during the Dodgers' 1978 postseason run.  Nevertheless, the Dodgers informally kept Fernando Valenzuela's #34 out of circulation since he last played for the team in 1990. In 2023, the Dodgers announced that his number would be officially retired.

The San Francisco Giants have kept Tim Lincecum's #55 out of circulation since he departed after the 2015 season, though it is not formally retired.

The Miami Marlins have not issued José Fernández’s #16 since his death in September 2016.

The Milwaukee Brewers have not issued Jim Gantner’s #17 since his retirement.

The Seattle Mariners have kept the following numbers out of circulation since the departure of a popular member of the team who wore it: #19 (Jay Buhner), and #51 (initially for Randy Johnson, and later for Ichiro Suzuki).

On Opening Day of the 2012 season, the New York Mets unveiled a memorial "Kid 8" logo to honor the late Gary Carter. Although no Met has worn the number 8 since Carter's election to the Hall of Fame, it is not retired. Following Willie Mays' retirement in 1973, Mets owner Joan Payson promised him that the team would not reissue his #24. In the following four decades, three Met players ended up wearing it: Kelvin Torve (a minor-league callup mistakenly issued the number that wore it for ten days in 1990), Rickey Henderson (1999-2000), and Robinson Cano (2019).).  The Mets formally retired Willie Mays' #24 during the Mets Old Timers Day festivities on August 27, 2022. The Mets have not issued #5 since the retirement of David Wright.

The New York Yankees have not re-issued Paul O'Neill's #21 since he ended his career, except for a brief period in 2008 when Morgan Ensberg and then LaTroy Hawkins wore #21, before fan complaints led Hawkins to change his number to No. 22 in April. However, the Yankees formally retired O’Neill’s #21 on August 21, 2022.

The Baltimore Orioles have not re-issued numbers 7, 44, and 46 since the passing of Cal Ripken, Sr., Elrod Hendricks, and Mike Flanagan respectively. The team has placed a moratorium on the three numbers in their honors.

The Boston Red Sox have not re-issued uniform numbers 21 (Roger Clemens), 33 (Jason Varitek) and 49 (Tim Wakefield) since those players left the Red Sox or ended their careers.

The St. Louis Cardinals have not re-issued Albert Pujols's #5 since he left the team after 2011.  Pujols returned to the team in 2022, and was reissued his old #5.

After Darryl Kile's death in 2002, the teams he played for (Colorado Rockies, Houston Astros, and St. Louis Cardinals) took his #57 out of circulation. The Cardinals first re-issued the number in 2021 Spring Training, to pitcher Zack Thompson.

The Colorado Rockies have not re-issued Carlos Gonzalez's #5 since he left the team after 2018.

The Tampa Bay Rays have not re-issued Evan Longoria's #3 since he left the team after 2017.

The Los Angeles Angels had not re-issued Nick Adenhart's #34, after he was killed in a car accident on April 9, 2009, although Noah Syndergaard requested and received the number when he joined the team in 2022.  He stated that he wanted to wear his old Mets’ number as a tribute to Adenhart. The Angels have not re-issued Tim Salmon's #15 since his retirement at the end of the 2006 season. They have not retired Tyler Skaggs #45 since he died on July 1, 2019, although it is not in use anymore. For the remainder of the 2019 season, they put the 45 on the mound instead of the sponsor.

Number retired by Major League Baseball 

Normally the individual clubs are responsible for retiring numbers. On April 15, 1997, Major League Baseball took the unusual move of retiring a number for all teams. On the 50th anniversary of Jackie Robinson's breaking the major league color barrier, his number 42 was retired throughout the majors, at the order of Commissioner Bud Selig. This meant that no future player on any major league team could wear number 42, although players wearing #42 at the time were allowed to continue wearing it (Mariano Rivera was the last active player to be grandfathered in, retiring after the 2013 season).

Starting in the 2007 season, the 60th anniversary of Robinson's Major League debut, players and coaches have all worn the number 42 as a tribute to Robinson on Jackie Robinson Day, April 15.

There is a lobby to have uniform #21 retired in all of baseball to honor Roberto Clemente.

Similar honors

Players who pre-date uniform numbers
Four teams have honored players who played before the advent of uniform numbers by placing their names among those of players whose numbers have been retired:
Philadelphia Phillies:  Grover Cleveland Alexander, Chuck Klein; both are denoted with a stylized "P" at Citizens Bank Park (Klein had various numbers in the later years of his career, but never wore one consistently)
Detroit Tigers:  Ty Cobb, Mickey Cochrane, Sam Crawford, Harry Heilmann, Hughie Jennings, George Kell, Heinie Manush; Cobb's name is displayed on the left-field wall of Comerica Park along with the players whose numbers have been retired; the others have their names displayed on the right-field wall (Cochrane actually wore #3 for the Tigers, and Kell wore three different numbers, but the Tigers have not retired these numbers), along with former manager Sparky Anderson. The Tigers eventually retired #3, but that was for Alan Trammell, not Cochrane.  
San Francisco (New York) Giants:  Christy Mathewson and John McGraw; both are denoted with "NY" and their names at Oracle Park
St. Louis Cardinals:  Rogers Hornsby, denoted with an "SL" and his name at Busch Stadium

Broadcasters

Bob Murphy and Ralph Kiner – New York Mets; The radio booth at both Shea Stadium and Citi Field are named for the beloved, late Murphy. The television booth at Citi Field is named for Kiner, who continued to broadcast some home games for the Mets until his death in early 2014.  In addition, a special memorial logo honoring Kiner, depicting a microphone along with his name and the years 1922–2014, was displayed at Citi Field on the left field wall adjacent to, but not as a part of, the Mets' retired numbers, from 2014 to 2016.  In the 2016 Mets yearbook, a sidebar in an article on Mike Piazza's upcoming number retirement implies that Kiner has been "retired" a la William A. Shea.  This was reinforced when the Mets' retired numbers were moved to the roof facade during the 2016 season to accommodate Mike Piazza's #31; Kiner's "number" was placed adjacent to the Shea and Jackie Robinson numbers, no longer separated from the others.    
Jack Buck – St. Louis Cardinals; honored with a drawing of a microphone on the wall with the retired numbers.
Lon Simmons, Russ Hodges, and Jon Miller – San Francisco Giants; honored with stylized old-style radio microphone displayed in place of a number.
Marty Brennaman, Waite Hoyt, and Joe Nuxhall – Cincinnati Reds; honored with microphones by the broadcast booth.
Jerry Coleman – San Diego Padres; a "star on the wall" in reference to his trademark phrase "You can hang a star on that one!" The star is painted in gold on the front of the press box down the right field line, accompanied by Coleman's name in white. Upon Coleman's death in 2014, the broadcast booth at Petco Park was named in his honor.
Harry Kalas and Richie Ashburn – Philadelphia Phillies; At Citizens Bank Park, the restaurant built into the base of the main scoreboard is named "Harry the K's" in Kalas's honor. After Kalas's death, the Phillies' TV-broadcast booth was renamed "The Harry Kalas Broadcast Booth". It is directly next to the radio-broadcast booth, which is named "The Richie 'Whitey' Ashburn Broadcast Booth".  They both also have statues at Citizens Bank Park (though Ashburn is in uniform for his statue).
Ernie Harwell – Detroit Tigers; honored with his name alongside the retired players on the Left-Centerfield Brick wall in Comerica Park and a statue & portrait at the stadium's front entrance. Honored with the Media Center named after him also.
Bob Uecker – "50 Years in Baseball" along with Uecker's name is next to the Brewers retired numbers at American Family Field.
Tom Cheek – Toronto Blue Jays; honored with a spot on the Rogers Centre's "Level of Excellence" bearing his name and, in place of a jersey number, 4,306 – his streak of consecutive regular-season broadcasts.
Harry Caray and Jack Brickhouse – Chicago Cubs: Caray is remembered inside and outside of Wrigley Field. A statue of him leading the crowd in "Take Me Out to the Ballgame" is near the bleacher entrance (originally at the corner of Addison Street and Sheffield Avenue), and a caricature of him adorns his former WGN-TV broadcast booth. Brickhouse's catch phrase, "Hey hey!" is memorialized in large red letters on each foul pole. (Brickhouse also has a statue on Michigan Avenue.)
Dave Niehaus – Seattle Mariners; the press box at T-Mobile Park was renamed the "Dave Niehaus Media Center" on April 8, 2011, prior to the Mariners' home opener against the Cleveland Indians.  In addition, a part of First Avenue NW outside the stadium was renamed Dave Niehaus Way, and the wall in deep right-center field also has a microphone with a Dave Niehaus graphic. There is the Dave Niehaus Statue on the Main Concourse at Section 105.
Vin Scully – Los Angeles Dodgers; in 2001, the Dodgers honored Scully by naming the press box at Dodger Stadium the "Vin Scully Press Box". However, on January 29, 2016, the Los Angeles City Council in a unanimous vote, renamed Elysian Park Avenue to Vin Scully Avenue, changing the address of Dodger Stadium to 1000 Vin Scully Ave.
Arch McDonald and Bob Wolff - Washington Senators: MacDonald and Wolff's names are on the Washington Nationals' Ring of Honor at Nationals Park.
Bill King – Oakland Athletics; The Athletics named their broadcast facilities the "Bill King Broadcast Booth" after King's death in 2005.

Owners and contributors
The initials of the late San Diego Padres owner Ray Kroc are painted in gold on the front of the pressbox down the right field line, accompanied by his name in white.
The initials of the late Boston Red Sox owners Tom and Jean Yawkey are rendered in Morse code and painted in white on the manual scoreboard on Fenway Park's Green Monster.
Charles Bronfman was inducted into the Expos Hall of Fame as its inaugural member in 1993, and a circular patch placed on the right field wall with his name, the number 83, which he used to wear during spring training, and the words "FONDATEUR / FOUNDER".
On April 8, 2008, the final opening day at Shea Stadium, the New York Mets unveiled a "Shea" logo which was displayed on the left-field fence next to the team's retired numbers.  The stadium was named for William Shea, a prominent lawyer who was responsible for the return of National League baseball to New York.
Walter A. Haas Jr., honorary jersey retired (with stylized Old English "A" in place of a number) in 1995, located in right field. Owner of the Oakland Athletics from 1980 until 1995. Haas purchased the team from Charles O. Finley in 1980, saving the team from potentially moving out of the area.
At the start of the 2007 season, the Kansas City Royals designated Seat #9 in Section 127, Row C at Kauffman Stadium as the "Buck O'Neil Legacy Seat" in honor of Negro leagues legend and Royals scout Buck O'Neil.  During each home game, the Royals honor a fan who exemplifies O'Neil's spirit of humanitarianism and community service by inviting that fan to sit in the Buck O'Neil Legacy Seat.
Paul Beeston and Pat Gillick, the Toronto Blue Jays's former president and general manager, respectively, have been inducted into the team's Level of Excellence, alongside the team's retired numbers. In addition, a Baseball Hall of Fame banner for Gillick hangs in the Rogers Centre rafters.
A statue of former Arlington, Texas mayor Tom Vandergriff is located at Vandergriff Plaza at Globe Life Park alongside those of former Texas Rangers Nolan Ryan and Ivan Rodriguez, both of whom had their numbers retired.  Vandergriff was responsible for bringing Major League Baseball to the Dallas-Fort Worth area.
The New York Yankees' spring training facility, George M. Steinbrenner Field is named in honor of its late owner George Steinbrenner.

Umpires
See:

See also

Monument Park (Yankee Stadium), includes retired numbers of the New York Yankees

Notes

References

Further reading
Baseball Uniforms of the 20th Century, Marc Okkonen, 1991, Sterling Publishing.

External links

A team-by-team list

Retired
 
 
Major League Baseball